A list of people who are from or have lived in Lewiston, New York (including: The Village of Lewiston, Lewiston Heights, the Tuscarora Reservation, Pekin, and Colonial Village). Individuals are listed in alphabetical order by last name in each category.

Artists
 Jacob Kassay, painter

Authors
 James Fenimore Cooper, American writer who stayed during the summer of 1821
 Catherine Gildiner, who wrote the best-selling memoir Too Close to the Falls 
 Herbert Richardson, publisher and founder of The Edwin Mellen Press

Bands, composers, and musicians
 Tim Easton, guitarist, singer-songwriter

Business and industry
 Benjamin Barton, businessman and builder of the Frontier House
 Samuel Barton, businessman and builder of the Frontier House
 Frank A. Dudley, former lawyer, politician, hotelier and business owner
 William Morgan, New York businessman and author on Freemasonry
 Paul A. Schoellkopf, industrialist and chairman of the Buffalo Niagara Electric Corporation

Entertainers and actors

Military
 Joseph Brant, Mohawk military and political leader

Politics and law
 John Ceretto, New York State Assemblyman
 Bates Cooke, member United States House of Representatives and later New York State Comptroller
 John B. Daly, politician
 Noah Davis, politician
 Francine DelMonte, former New York State Assemblywoman
 Clinton Rickard, Tuscarora chief
 Stefano Magaddino, mafia boss
 James S. Simmons, politician
 Horatio J. Stow, politician
 Sheldon Thompson, former Mayor of Buffalo, New York

Religion, charities, social advocacy
 Wallace "Mad Bear" Anderson, Native American activist
 John Napoleon Brinton Hewitt, notable linguist
 Barney E. Warren, Christian hymnwriter and minister

Sports
 Jack Armstrong, TV analyst and announcer for the Toronto Raptors
 Mike Bell, Major League Baseball player
 Kyle Cerminara, former US Olympic wrestler
 Rick Dudley, professional hockey player and coach
 Daryl Johnston, fullback for the Dallas Cowboys
 Patti Lank, curler
 Robert Lindley Murray, chemist and tennis player
 Vince Molyneaux, Major League Baseball player
 Earl Seick, former professional football player

References

People from Lewiston, New York
People from Niagara County, New York